There are 83 counties in the U.S. state of Michigan. The boundaries of these counties have not changed substantially since 1897. However, throughout the 19th century, the state legislature frequently adjusted county boundaries. County creation was intended to fulfill the goal of establishing government over unorganized territory, but a more important goal was encouraging settlement by surveying the land and dividing it into saleable sections.

The creation of counties generally occurred in two stages. First the boundaries of a county were declared and given a name. The county appeared on maps, even though this may have been the entire extent of a county's tangible existence for several years. During this period, the as-yet–unorganized county was attached to another already organized county for administrative purposes. The legislature frequently changed the administrative attachment of these unorganized counties. Residents of such an attached county could petition the legislature for organization, which was the granting of full legal recognition to the county.

There are many cities and villages that span county boundaries in Michigan, including its capital, Lansing. For a few years during the early 1970s, split cities briefly had authority to petition to change the county boundaries to accord with the city boundaries. The only city to take advantage of this brief opportunity was New Baltimore (previously split between Macomb County and St. Clair County; now completely in Macomb). This transfer of territory from St. Clair to Macomb was the only county boundary change in Michigan since the early 20th century.

The state constitution of 1850 permitted an incorporated city with a population of at least 20,000 to be organized into a separate county of its own. The Constitution of 1908 retained this provision, but raised the population threshold to 100,000. No city was ever organized into an independent county in this fashion and when a new Constitution took effect in 1963, the provision was removed.

Michigan's boundary with Illinois is formed by Lake Michigan, and three counties have water boundaries with Illinois: Berrien County, Van Buren County, and Allegan County. Michigan also has a boundary with Minnesota, which is formed by Lake Superior. The water boundary in this instance is formed by two counties: Ontonagon County and Keweenaw County.  The land boundary with Wisconsin continues into Lake Superior, involving both Gogebic County (which shares a land border) and Ontonagon County (water boundary only).

Etymologies

Nine counties have names invented by the ethnologist Henry Schoolcraft, usually adapted from parts of Native American words, but sometimes having parts from Greek, Arabic and Latin roots.
Schoolcraft's made-up words have disputed sources. While he was a devotee of Native American words and culture, some of his words may have originated with tribes from other areas of the country, such as New York or the Northeast, where many settlers to Michigan came from.  Real Native words were eradicated, and he substituted made-up words, sometimes with a kernel of Indian language or sound in them.

A second group of four counties were renamed for Irish locales (counties Antrim, Clare, Roscommon and Wexford), apparently because it was close to the heart for certain Michigan legislators or their constituents.

Ten counties, the so-called "cabinet counties", were named for persons who served in Andrew Jackson's presidential administration, which was tied to Michigan's anticipated ascendancy to statehood.  Eight were named in 1829. Livingston County was named in 1833. Cass County was also named in 1829, but Governor Lewis Cass did not become a member of Jackson's Cabinet until 1831.

List of counties

Defunct counties and county precursors
This listing includes only counties or county precursors created by the Territory of Michigan or the State of Michigan. It does not include any counties which may have existed within the boundaries of any of the permutations of the Territory of Michigan or the present-day boundaries of the State of Michigan but were created by any other entity (another state, territorial government, the federal government, etc.) prior to the existence of the creation of the Territory of Michigan.
 Brown County, formed on December 3, 1818, from unorganized territory when Michigan Territory was expanded to include area west of Lake Michigan upon formation of the state of Illinois. Transferred to Wisconsin Territory on July 3, 1836, and continues as Brown County, Wisconsin.
 Crawford County, formed on December 3, 1818, from unorganized territory when Michigan Territory was expanded to include area west of Lake Michigan upon formation of the state of Illinois. Transferred to Wisconsin Territory on July 3, 1836, and continues as Crawford County, Wisconsin.
 Des Moines County, formed on October 1, 1834, from unorganized territory. Transferred to Wisconsin Territory on July 3, 1836, and continues as Des Moines County, Iowa.
 Detroit District, formed on July 3, 1805, as a county precursor by Territorial Governor Lewis Cass to carry out the Territory's judicial and administrative functions. Superseded by counties on October 2, 1818, as proclaimed by William Woodbridge, Secretary of Michigan Territory.
 Dubuque County, formed on October 1, 1834, from unorganized territory. Transferred to Wisconsin Territory on July 3, 1836, and continues as Dubuque County, Iowa.
 Erie District, formed on July 3, 1805, as a county precursor by Territorial Governor William Hull to carry out the Territory's judicial and administrative functions. Included parts of modern-day Indiana and the Toledo Strip. Although the Erie District was officially superseded by counties by proclamation of Michigan Territorial Secretary William Woodbridge on October 2, 1818, the area of the district had actually been lost to the State of Indiana when it was created on December 11, 1816.
 Huron District formed on July 3, 1805, as a county precursor by Territorial Governor William Hull to carry out the Territory's judicial and administrative functions. Superseded by counties on October 2, 1818, as proclaimed by William Woodbridge, Secretary of Michigan Territory.
 Iowa County, formed on January 1, 1830, from part of Crawford County. Transferred to Wisconsin Territory on July 3, 1836, and continues as Iowa County, Wisconsin.
 Isle Royale County, formed on March 4, 1875, from part of Keweenaw County. County became officially unorganized on March 13, 1885, and was attached to Houghton County, for judicial and administrative purposes. Michigan Legislature officially dissolves Isle Royale County and returns it to Keweenaw County on April 9, 1897.
Keskkauko County, formed on April 1, 1840, from part of Mackinac County. Renamed Charlevoix County, on March 8, 1843. Annexed to Emmet County, on January 29, 1853, and eliminated as a county. Reformed as Charlevoix County from Emmet, Antrim, and Otsego, Counties on April 2, 1869, albeit with boundaries that differed somewhat from the 1840–1853 iteration of Keskkauko–Charlevoix County.
 Manitou County, formed on February 12, 1855, from parts of Emmet County and Leelanau County. On March 16, 1861, Manitou County was attached to Mackinac County for meetings of the District Court, but all other County functions were unchanged. Four years later, on March 10, 1865, the District Court attachment was changed to Leelanau County instead of Mackinac. Another four years later, on March 24, 1869, the District Court attachment to Leelanau County was terminated. The entire Manitou County government was dissolved on April 4, 1895, and the county was abolished. It was absorbed by Charlevoix County, and Leelanau County.
 Michilimackinac District formed on July 3, 1805, as a county precursor by Territorial Governor William Hull to carry out the Territory's judicial and administrative functions. Incorporated into Wayne County, on October 18, 1816.
 Milwaukee County, formed on September 6, 1834, from part of Brown County. Transferred to Wisconsin Territory on July 3, 1836, and continues as Milwaukee County, Wisconsin.
 Omeena County, formed on April 1, 1840, from part of Mackinac County. Annexed to Grand Traverse County, on February 3, 1853.
 Wyandot County, formed on April 1, 1840, from part of Mackinac County. Annexed to Cheboygan County, on January 29, 1853.
Washington County, formed in 1867 from Marquette County, but declared unconstitutional.

See also
 Cabinet counties
 List of abolished U.S. counties
 List of county subdivisions in Michigan

References

Further reading
 
 County histories published in Michigan History Magazine. Some back issues that include these histories are still available for purchase.
 
 
  at Google books

External links
 Bibliography by county and region, including origin of county names, Clarke Historical Library, Central Michigan University
 Freelang Ojibwe Dictionary
 History of County Creation
 Michigan County History and atlases, digitized database, including Powers, Perry F., assisted by H.G. Cutler, A History of Northern Michigan and its People (1912)
 Michigan County names per the Michigan government.
 Table of dates counties laid out and organized
 History of the name Sheboygan
 American FactFinder for the 2010 Census

Michigan, counties in
 
Counties